Helmiopsis is a genus of flowering plants belonging to the family Malvaceae.

Its native range is Madagascar.

The genus name of Helmiopsis is in honour of C. Helm, German clergyman in Berlin and  amateur botanist. It was first described and published in Bull. Soc. Bot. France Vol.91 on page 230 in 1945.

Known species
According to Kew;
Helmiopsis bernieri 
Helmiopsis boivinii 
Helmiopsis calcicola 
Helmiopsis glaberrima 
Helmiopsis hily 
Helmiopsis linearifolia 
Helmiopsis polyandra 
Helmiopsis pseudopopulus 
Helmiopsis richardii 
Helmiopsis rigida 
Helmiopsis sphaerocarpa

References

Dombeyoideae
Malvaceae genera
Endemic flora of Madagascar
Plants described in 1945